Archery was contested from December 13 to December 17 at the 1998 Asian Games at the Thammasat University, in Bangkok, Thailand.

South Korea dominated the competition winning all four gold medals.

Medalists

Medal table

Participating nations
A total of 91 athletes from 16 nations competed in archery at the 1998 Asian Games:

References
 Results

External links 
 Olympic Council of Asia

 
1998 Asian Games events
1998
Asian Games
International archery competitions hosted by Thailand